Searsport Terminal is a port in Searsport, Maine. Searsport provides tanker offloading and temporary storage services for crude oil transportation. The terminal is also home to the beginning for the Searsport-Loring Pipeline.

External links
Contact information

Ports and harbors of Maine
Oil terminals
Petroleum infrastructure in the United States
Energy infrastructure in Maine